Steve Foley  may refer to:

Steve Foley (Australian footballer) (1902–1948), Australian rules footballer with Fitzroy
Steve Foley (defensive back) (born 1953), American football player for the Denver Broncos, 1976–1986
Steve Foley (diver) (born 1957), Australian Olympic diver and diving coach
Steve Foley (drummer) (1959–2008), drummer for The Replacements
Steve Foley (footballer, born 1953), English association football coach
Steve Foley (footballer, born 1962), English association football player
Steve Foley (linebacker) (born 1975), American football player for the Cincinnati Bengals, Houston Texans and San Diego Chargers, 1998–2006

See also
Steven Foley-Sheridan (born 1986), Irish footballer